Jub Sorkh may refer to:
 Jub Sorkh-e Olya
 Jub Sorkh-e Sofla